This is a list of chapters of Sigma Alpha Mu fraternity.

Active chapters and colonies

The following is a list of active chapters and colonies (prospective chapters) recognized by the fraternity as of May 2022. There are currently 46 active groups, including 44 chapters, 2 provisional chapters (~), 0 colonies (^), and 0 interest groups (*). Chapters are listed in the order of their original founding.

Master list of Sigma Alpha Mu chapters

Former chapters

The Delta Gamma chapter at the State University of New York at Oneonta, founded in 1985, disaffiliated with the National office in 1995 after recognized fraternities were no longer allowed to give bids to first semester freshmen.

The Sigma Phi chapter at Bucknell University in Lewisburg, Pennsylvania, was suspended due to lack of pledges in 2008.

The Chi chapter, founded at McGill University in Montreal in 1919, was ordered to shut down in 2008 after refusing to pay for the National insurance policy because of its failure to comply with Canadian law. The Chi chapter continued to operate as "an independent chapter of Sigma Alpha Mu in Quebec". The Chi chapter's "loyalist policy" indicates that it still recognizes all other active chapters and alumni including those initiated into the Delta Pi chapter in Ottawa, Ontario. Chi chapter is the oldest chapter of Sigma Alpha Mu to be established outside of the United States. As the oldest Canadian chapter of Sigma Alpha Mu, the chartering of Chi chapter on November 25, 1919, made Sigma Alpha Mu an international fraternity for the first time in its history.

The Xi chapter at the Massachusetts Institute of Technology disaffiliated from the national fraternity and is now a co-ed Independent Living Group known as Fenway House.

The Delta Iota chapter at the State University of New York College at Brockport disaffiliated from the national fraternity.

The Delta Delta chapter at Alfred University in Alfred, New York, was dissolved in 2002 when the university disallowed Greek letter organizations on campus.

Canadian chapters
The National office forced all four Canadian chapters to cease operations or disaffiliate from the fraternity during the period between August 2006 to August 2008. Delta Pi chapter at the University of Ottawa informed the Octagon that its American insurance provider failed to comply with Canadian law in 2005. They requested permission to secure an alternative and equivalent Canadian provider. Their request was denied in August 2006 and their charter was revoked. Delta Omicron chapter at York University and Delta Kappa chapter at the University of Western Ontario were forced to shut down in 2007 due to impecuniosity, which was a direct consequence of the National insurance issue.

By 2008, Chi chapter at McGill University was the only surviving Canadian chapter. It demanded that the National office allow Delta Pi chapter's 2005 appeal and establish a Canadian insurance alternative pursuant thereto. It further demanded that the National office act to quash the Octagon's 2006 expulsion order issued against Delta Pi chapter. The National office offered to consider the former but rejected the latter out of hand. Chi chapter responded by ceasing all financial transfers to Indianapolis. The National office subsequently ordered Chi chapter to cease operations in August 2008. However, Chi chapter refused to comply and has continued to operate notwithstanding the order. In 2012, Delta Pi chapter was reinstated and is once again active at the University of Ottawa.

References

External links 
Sigma Alpha Mu Fraternity website

chapters
Lists of chapters of United States student societies by society